Aliens: Nightmare Asylum is the title of a sci-fi novel by Steve Perry, set in the fictional Alien movie universe.  It is a sequel to Aliens: Earth Hive. The book was published by Bantam Books on April 1, 1993.

Plot
Wilks, Billie, and Bueller are the last survivors of a devastating assault on the aliens' home planet. They are again refugees when they return to the solar system, fleeing Earth's Alien infestation in a military transport that hurtles them through unknown space and an unknown destination.

They are unaware that the remote colony and military outpost they will approach is at the mercy of a general named Spears with an agenda all his own. Now Billie, Wilks, and Bueller face a new nightmare, and it is nothing they could ever have imagined: a gift of madness from an alien world, an unbalanced mind and the experiences of a mysterious pilot named Lieutenant Ellen Ripley.

References

Alien (franchise) novels